Triple-cooked chips are a type of chips developed by the English chef Heston Blumenthal. Blumenthal began work on the recipe in 1993, and eventually developed the three-stage cooking process. The result is what Blumenthal calls "chips with a glass-like crust and a soft, fluffy centre".

The Sunday Times described triple-cooked chips as Blumenthal's most influential culinary innovation, which had given the chip "a whole new lease of life".

History
Blumenthal said he was "obsessed with the idea of the perfect chip", and described how, from 1992 onwards, he worked on a method for making "chips with a glass-like crust and a soft, fluffy centre". He researched the starch content of different varieties of potato and experimented with drying chips by microwaving, desiccating or even individually pinpricking them. Eventually, Blumenthal developed the three-stage cooking process known as triple-cooked chips, which he identifies as "the first recipe I could call my own".

First served at the Fat Duck in 1995, triple-cooked chips have since become common in restaurants.

In 2014, the London Fire Brigade attributed an increase in chip pan fires to the increased popularity of "posh chips", including triple-cooked chips.

Preparation

Blumenthal's technique
Previously, the traditional practice for cooking chips was a two-stage process, in which chipped potatoes were fried in oil first at a relatively low temperature to soften them and then at a higher temperature to crisp up the outside. Heston's recipe involves simmering the potatoes first in water for 20–30 minutes until they are almost falling apart and have developed many little cracks across the surface, at which point they are drained and as much moisture as possible is expelled by placing them in either a freezer or desiccator machine. This additional stage is designed to achieve three objectives. First, cooking the potatoes gently in water helps ensure they acquire a properly soft texture. Second, the cracks that develop in the chips provide places for oil to collect and harden during frying, making them crunchy. Third, thoroughly drying out the chips drives off moisture that would otherwise keep the crust from becoming crisp. Blumenthal describes moisture as the "enemy" of crisp chips.

The second stage of low-temperature frying is as essential as the first, according to Heston, as it makes "any starch left in the surface cells dissolve and combine to create a rigid outer layer that can withstand the higher temperature of the final frying". This second stage is time-consuming, he acknowledges, but must not be omitted. "A single frying at a high temperature leads to a thin crust that can easily be rendered soggy by whatever moisture remains in the chip’s interior."

Other chefs, such as Joël Robuchon, had previously used such a method of cooking chips in simmering water before subjecting them to a two-stage frying.

Variations

Triple-cooked chips cooked in duck fat is another variation. Various cultivars of potato are used, such as sebago, Rooster and Maris Piper.

See also

 List of deep fried foods
 List of potato dishes
 List of twice-baked foods
 Pommes soufflées – a variety of French fried potato. Slices of potato are fried twice, once at 150 °C (300 °F) and then again after cooling, at 190 °C (375 °F).

References

Bibliography
 Blumenthal, Heston (2006). In Search of Perfection. Bloomsbury Publishing. 
 Blumenthal, Heston (2008). The Big Fat Duck Cookbook. Bloomsbury Publishing Plc. 
 Blumenthal, Heston (2011). Heston Blumenthal at Home. Bloomsbury.

Further reading

External links

 Triple-Cooked Chips. Epicurious.

Potato dishes
Deep fried foods